Paridhi Sharma is an Indian television actress best known for playing Jodha Bai in Zee TV's Jodha Akbar and Goddess Vaishno Devi in Jag Janani Maa Vaishno Devi - Kahani Mata Rani Ki. She also played the role of Babita Chaddha in Sony Entertainment Television's Patiala Babes and Ambika in &TV's Yeh Kahan Aa Gaye Hum.

Personal life
Paridhi Sharma was born in Indore, Madhya Pradesh, India. Since 2009, she is married to Ahmedabad based businessman, Tanmai Saksena. They have a son together, who was born in 2016.

Media image 
Sharma was named Top Television Actress by Rediffs in their Top 10 Television Actresses List of 2014.

Filmography

Television

Films

Awards

References

External links
 
 

Living people
Place of birth missing (living people)
Indian television actresses
Indian soap opera actresses
21st-century Indian actresses
Actresses from Indore
1987 births